The 2010 Texas A&M Aggies football team (often referred to as "A&M" or the "Aggies") represented Texas A&M University in the 2010 NCAA Division I FBS football season. The team was led by third-year head coach Mike Sherman and played their home games at Kyle Field in College Station, Texas. The team's defense was led by first-year coach Tim DeRuyter. They were members of the South Division of the Big 12 Conference.

The Aggies finished the season 9–4, 6–2 in Big 12 play and were South Division champions with Oklahoma and Oklahoma State. They were invited to the Cotton Bowl Classic where they were defeated by LSU, 24–41.

Schedule

Personnel

Roster

Notable players

Trent Hunter, DB, Walter Camp Defensive Player of the Week (Nebraska); Honorable mention All-Big 12
Jerrod Johnson, QB, was the starter for the first seven games. He broke school records for career passing yards, single game completions, and career total offense.
Christine Michael, RB, season cut short due to injury during Texas Tech game
Ryan Swope, WR, broke season catch record; honorable mention All-Big 12
Ryan Tannehill, QB, has been the starting quarterback since Texas Tech game, where he broke the single game passing record. He played wide receiver earlier in the season. All-Big 12 Honorable mention.
Patrick Lewis, OL, plays for the Seahawks in 2015
Other All-Big 12 coach's selections include Matt Allen (second team OL). Total honorable mention selections is 22.

Coaching staff

Game summaries

Stephen F. Austin

Louisiana Tech

Florida International

Oklahoma State

Arkansas

Missouri

Kansas

Jerrod Johnson and Ryan Tannehill split time at quarterback for the first time.

Texas Tech

Ryan Tannehill's first career start. Johnson benched.

Oklahoma

Texas A&M defeated Oklahoma for the first time since 2002.  Also the first time A&M beat a ranked opponent at home since 2007 Texas. It was an upset victory that included 3 goal-line stands by the A&M defense. OU ran 15 plays under the Aggie 10-yard line, and gained only 11 yards. Michael Hodges was part of the 3 goal-line stands.  He earned Big 12 Defensive Player of the Week honors for his career-high 19 tackles. A&M also became ranked after the game, for the first time since September 21, 2007.

Oklahoma's loss was historically significant. OU ran the most plays (104) in its history, beating the previous record of 102. In games in which the Sooners ran more than 90 plays, the Sooners had been 39–0. The Sooners also had only 29 first downs; OU was 57–0 before the game, in which it made at least 29 first downs.

Baylor

Cyrus Gray picked up 137 rushing yards for a career-high of 4 touchdowns.

Nebraska

Record-setting crowd of 90,079. Cyrus Gray's fifth consecutive 100-yard rushing game (Darren Lewis 1990). Trent Hunter had 2 interceptions. Nebraska was charged with a school-record 16 penalties for a total of 145 yards, and Texas A&M only had 2 penalties for 10 yards. No touchdowns were scored for either team, and all of the points were scored by way of field goals. Taylor Martinez re-injured his right ankle in the first quarter when he was stepped on by one of his offensive linemen.

Questionable roughing the passer call against Nebraska. Bo Pelini's behavior during the game was called into question.

Aggies won Tostitos Fiesta Bowl National Team of the Week.

Texas

Cyrus Gray had a 200-yard game, first A&M RB since Leeland McElroy 1995. This game pushed Cyrus Gray over the 1,000 yard rushing mark for the 2010 season. Texas finished with its first losing season since 1997. With the win, the Aggies won a share of the Big 12 South Division title.

LSU – Cotton Bowl Classic

NFL Draft
1st Round, 2nd Overall Pick by the Denver Broncos—Sr. LB Von Miller.

References

Texas AandM
Texas A&M Aggies football seasons
Texas AandM Aggies football